The Head is a Spanish-made, English-language psychological thriller television series directed by Jorge Dorado which premiered on .

Premise
Winter has fallen on the South Pole. The sun will soon disappear for the next six months. A small team, known as the Winterers, will remain at the Polaris VI Antarctic Research Station to continue their innovative research, a crucial part in the fight against climate change, under the command of renowned biologist Arthur Wilde (John Lynch). But when spring comes, summer commander Johan Berg (Alexandre Willaume) returns to the station only to find the entire team are either dead or missing. A killer is on the loose, and Annika (Laura Bach), Johan's wife, is missing. If he wants to find her alive, he will have to trust Maggie (Katharine O’Donnelly), the young doctor who is profoundly shaken and apparently the sole survivor from the group.

Cast and characters

Alexandre Willaume as Johan Berg (6 episodes), the station's summer commander. His wife Annika remains in the station during winter and is missing when Johan returns after six months, having lost communications for three weeks. He tries to find out what happened in order to find his wife.
Katharine O'Donnelly as Maggie Mitchell (6 episodes), the new station doctor during winter. She is one of three newbies at Polaris VI, along with Aki and Heather, and becomes close to Aki. Upon their return, the summer team finds her hiding and afraid as one survivor next to two missing and seven dead team members. She tries to reconstruct the past events while being worn-out physically and mentally. The story she tells leads Johan's search for his wife. 
On Polaris VI, he continues the research in order to fight climate change. He is a domineering and manipulative character. Although he doesn't lead the research station, as the head scientist he does have some authority towards the staff. At first classified as missing, he is another survivor.
Richard Sammel as Erik Osterland (6 episodes), the winter commander of Polaris VI. He has a military background and tries hard to keep the team safe and together. He has a relationship with Ebba, the station's nurse.
Laura Bach as Annika Lundqvist (6 episodes), an ambitious and very dedicated biologist who discovered the bacterium together with Arthur. She remained at Polaris VI because she is determined to work on this crucial research and be acknowledged as well in a world very dominated by men. Upon Johan's return, Annika is missing, and he tries hard to find her.
Álvaro Morte as Ramón Lazaro (6 episodes), the station cook who has repeatedly returned to the station for many years now. He gets along with the crew, but can also become choleric and aggressive.
Tomohisa Yamashita as Aki Kobayashi (6 episodes), a young, ambitious biologist who works on his PhD. He admires Arthur Wilde and his work and is proud to work for him. Like Maggie and Heather he's new at the station. Aki and Maggie are very close, and he's protective of her, even more so when the killings begin. 
Sandra Andreis as Ebba Ullman (6 episodes), the station nurse who has spent many winters on Polaris VI already. She misses her kids and her family, but also has an affair with Erik, which is straining on her.
Amelia Hoy as Heather Blake (3 episodes), a Computer Officer from Texas who is very athletic and competitive. She is the third newbie on the station, along with Maggie and Aki.
Chris Reilly as Nils Hedlund (5 episodes), the station's Technician who is shown as very conflicted, drinking a lot and more and more affected by Polar T3 Syndrome.
Tom Lawrence as Miles Porter (5 episodes), the communications officer and one of the longest serving staff at Polaris VI.
Hannes Fohlin as Gus (6 episodes)
Andreas Rothlin Svensson as Micke Karlsson (6 episodes)
Mónica López as Astrid Casado (4 episodes)
Philippe Jacq as Damian Fowles (3 episodes)
Olga Wehrly as Sarah Jackson (2 episodes)
Shona McHugh as Sylvia (2 episodes)
Liliana Cabal as Anne (2 episodes)
 as Lars Olander (2 episodes)

Production 
The series was shot in a set in Tenerife, in the Canary Islands, whereas outdoor scenes were shot in Iceland.

In October 2021, The Mediapro Studio (detached from HBO Asia and Hulu Japan) reported that they were preparing a second season set in a container ship, directed by Jorge Dorado and written by Mariano Baselga (season 1 executive producer) and Jordi Galceran, with cinematography by David Acereto, with Laura Fernández Espeso, Javier Mendez and Bernat Elias credited as executive producers.

International broadcast

In the UK, Ireland, Germany, Austria, Switzerland and Luxembourg, streaming started on Starzplay on February 7, 2021. While in Brazil, it started exclusively on streaming service Globoplay.

In India, the series is streaming on Hotstar under "HBO Original" label.

References

External links
 

HBO Asia original programming
2020 Spanish television series debuts
Television shows set in Antarctica
Television shows filmed in Spain
Television shows filmed in Iceland
2020s Spanish drama television series
Hulu Japan